Musa is one of two or three genera in the family Musaceae. The genus includes flowering plants producing edible bananas and plantains. Around 70 species of Musa are known, with a broad variety of uses. Though they grow as high as trees, banana and plantain plants are not woody and their apparent "stem" is made up of the bases of the huge leaf stalks. Thus, they are technically gigantic herbaceous plants. Musa species are used as food plants by the larvae of some Lepidoptera species, including the giant leopard moth and other Hypercompe species, including H. albescens (only recorded on Musa), H. eridanus, and H. icasia.

Description 
The large herb is composed of a modified underground stem (rhizome), a false trunk of tightly rolled petioles, a network of roots, and a large flower spike. The false trunk is an aggregation of the basal portion of leaf sheathes; only when the plant is ready to flower does a true stem grow up through the sheath and droop back down towards. At the end of this stem, a peduncle forms (with M. ingens having the second-longest peduncle known, exceeded only by Agave salmiana), bearing many female flowers protected by large purple-red bracts. The extension of the stem (the rachis) continues growth downward, where terminal male flowers grow. The leaves originate from a pseudostem and unroll to show a leaf blade with two lamina halves. Musa species reproduce by both sexual (seed) and asexual (suckers) processes, using asexual means when producing sterile (unseeded) fruits. Further qualities to distinguish Musa include spirally arranged leaves, fruits as berries, the presence of latex-producing cells, flowers with five connate tepals and one member of the inner whorl distinct, and a petiole with one row of air channels.

Distribution
The native distribution of the genus Musa includes most of the Indomalayan realm and parts of north-eastern Australasia. It has been introduced to many other parts of the world with tropical or subtropical climates.

Systematics and taxonomy

History

The genus Musa was first named by Carl Linnaeus in 1753. The name is a Latinization of the Arabic name for the fruit, mauz (موز). Mauz meaning Musa is discussed in the 11th-century Arabic encyclopedia The Canon of Medicine, which was translated to Latin in medieval times and well known in Europe. Muz is also the Turkish, Persian, and Somali name for the fruit. Some sources assert that Musa is named for Antonius Musa, physician to the Emperor Augustus. 

According to linguist Mark Donohue and archaeologist Tim Denham, the ultimate origin of the Latinized form musa is in the Trans–New Guinea languages, where certain cultivars of bananas are known under a form *muku. From there, the term was borrowed into the Austronesian languages of the area, and migrated across Asia, via the Dravidian languages of India, into Persian, Greek, and Arabic as a Wanderwort:

{|class=wikitable
|+Possible transmission of musa from New Guinea to Latin
|Trans–New Guinea || Austronesian || Dravidian || Indic || Persian || Greek || Latin
|-
| #mugu || #mugu > muku > muu || mōte || mocā || mōz ~ mūz || mozā || musa
|}

As for the word banana, it came to English from Spanish and Portuguese, which had apparently obtained it from a West African language, possibly Wolof (Senegal).

From the time of Linnaeus until the 1940s, different types of edible bananas and plantains were given Linnaean binomial names, such as Musa cavendishii, as if they were species. In fact, edible bananas have an extremely complicated origin involving hybridization, mutation, and finally selection by humans. Most edible bananas are seedless (parthenocarpic), hence sterile, so they are propagated vegetatively. The giving of species names to what are actually very complex, largely asexual, hybrids (mostly of two species of wild bananas, Musa acuminata and Musa balbisiana) led to endless confusion in banana botany. In the 1940s and 1950s, it became clear to botanists that the cultivated bananas and plantains could not usefully be assigned Linnean binomials, but were better given cultivar names.

Sections

Musa sections have a history dating back to 1887, when M.P. Sagot published "Sur le genre Bananier", where the genus Musa was first formally classified. In this article, Sagot arranged the Musa species into three groups, although no section names were assigned to them. The grouping was based on morphological traits, establishing the trio as bananas with fleshy fruit, ornamental bananas with upright inflorescences and bracts that were vibrantly colored, and bananas that were giant in size.

Five years after Sagot's article, J.G. Baker made the first formal designation of Musa sections. To do so, he named three subgenera that almost paralleled the sections that had been described by Sagot. These sections were: 
 M. subg. Physocaulis Baker – defined by a bract with many flowers, inedible fruits, and a bottle-shaped stem
 M. subg. Rhodochlamys Baker – defined by brightly colored bracts with few flowers, usually inedible fruits, and cylindrical stems
 M. subg. Eumusa Baker – defined by green, brown, or dull-violet bracts with many flowers, usually edible fruits, and cylindrical stems.

After this classification, in 1947, Cheeseman reclassified the taxa based on morphological features and chromosome number. This project proposed four sections: 
 M. sect. Eumusa Cheesman (2n = 2x = 22)
 M. sect. Rhodochlamys (Baker) Cheesman (2n = 2x = 22)
 M. sect. Australimusa Cheesman (2n = 2x = 20)
 M. sect. Callimusa Cheesman (2n = 2x = 20)

The addition of another Musa section came in 1976 by G.C.G. Ardent. The added section, M. sect. Ingentimusa, Ardent was based on a single species, Musa ingens. This designation put the number of sections in Musa at five: Eumusa, Rhodochlamys, Callimusa, Australimusa, and Ingentimusa.

In the 21st century, genomics have become cheaper, more efficient, and more accurate, and Musa genetic research has increased exponentially. Research was conducted around a diversity of genomic markers (cpDNA, nrDNA, rDNA, introns, various spacers, etc.). The results of many of these studies suggested that the five sections of Musa defined by morphology (and listed above) were not monophyletic.

Based on the incorrect section grouping, Markku Häkkinen proposed another reclassification of the Musa sections in 2013. Using a multitude of genetic evidence and markers from other studies, Häkkinen suggested the reduction of five Musa sections into two: Musa and Callimusa. Unlike sectional classifications of the past, this hypothesis was based on genetic markers rather than morphological features or chromosome number. The two groups were generally formed by the clustering of the previously defined groups: 
Musa sect. Rhotochlamys and M. sect. Eumusa  became M. sect. Musa
M. sect. Ingetimusa, M. sect. Callimusa and M. sect. Australimusa became M. sect. Callimusa

The advance of genomic analysis technologies and further data on the relatedness of Musa species, formulated Häkkinen's two sections and later corroborated them as correct subcategories for the genus. The history of Musa sections provides an example of genomics superseding morphological evidence and thus classifications.

Species
The World Checklist of Selected Plant Families accepts 68 species and two primary hybrids, which are listed below. The assignment to sections is based on GRIN (where this gives the species), regrouped according to Wong et al.

Section Callimusa (incorporating Australimusa)

[A] and [C] indicate known placement in the former sections Australimusa and Callimusa, respectively.
M. × alinsanaya R.V.Valmayor [A]
M. azizii Häkkinen
M. barioensis Häkkinen
M. bauensis Häkkinen & Meekiong [C]
M. beccarii N.W.Simmonds [A]
M. boman Argent [A]
M. borneensis Becc. [C]
M. bukensis Argent [A] 
M. velutina
M. campestris Becc. [C]
M. coccinea Andrews [C] – scarlet banana
M. exotica R.V.Valmayor [C]
M. fitzalanii F.Muell. [A] – extinct
M. gracilis Holttum [C]
M. hirta Becc. [A]
M. insularimontana Hayata [A]
M. jackeyi W.Hill [A]
M. johnsii Argent [A]
M. lawitiensis Nasution & Supard. [C]
M. lokok Geri & Ng
M. lolodensis Cheesman [A]
M. maclayi F.Muell. ex Mikl.-Maclay [A]
M. monticola M.Hotta ex Argent [A]
M. muluensis M.Hotta [A]
M. paracoccinea A.Z.Liu & D.Z.Li [C]
M. peekelii Lauterb. [A]
M. salaccensis Zoll. ex Backer [A]
M. textilis Née [A] – Abacá
M. × troglodytarum L. [A] – the cultivated Fe'i bananas
M. tuberculata M.Hotta [A]
M. violascens Ridl. [C]
M. viridis R.V.Valmayor et al.
M. voonii Häkkinen

Section Ingentimusa
M. ingens N.W.Simmonds

Section Musa (incorporating Rhodochlamys)

M. acuminata Colla – wild seeded banana, one of the two main ancestors of modern edible banana cultivars
M. acuminata subsp. zebrina [= M. sumatrana] – blood banana
M. aurantiaca G.Mann ex Baker
M. balbisiana Colla – wild seeded banana, one of the two main ancestors of modern edible banana cultivars
M. banksii F.Muell.
M. basjoo Siebold & Zucc. ex Iinuma – Japanese fiber banana, hardy banana
M. cheesmanii N.W.Simmonds
M. chunii Häkkinen
M. griersonii Noltie
M. itinerans Cheesman
M. laterita Cheesman
M. mannii H.Wendl. ex Baker
M. nagensium Prain
M. ochracea K.Sheph.
M. ornata Roxb.
Musa × paradisiaca L. = M. acuminata × M. balbisiana – many of the cultivated edible bananas
M. rosea Baker
M. rubinea Häkkinen & C.H.Teo
M. rubra Wall. ex Kurz
M. sanguinea Hook.f.
M. schizocarpa N.W.Simmonds
M. siamensis Häkkinen & Rich.H.Wallace
M. sikkimensis Kurz
M. thomsonii (King ex Baker) A.M.Cowan & Cowan
M. truncata Ridl.
M. velutina H.Wendl. & Drude – pink banana
M. yunnanensis Häkkinen & H.Wang – Yunnan banana, wild forest banana
M. zaifui Häkkinen & H.Wang

Section undetermined or unknown

M. arfakiana Argent
M. arunachalensis A.Joe, Sreejith & M.Sabu
M. celebica Warb. ex K.Schum.
M. juwiniana Meekiong
M. kattuvazhana K.C.Jacob
M. lanceolata Warb. ex K.Schum.
M. lutea R.V.Valmayor et al.
M. sakaiana Meekiong et al.
M. shankarii Subba Rao & Kumari
M. splendida A.Chev.
M. tonkinensis R.V.Valmayor et al.
M. yamiensis C.L.Yeh & J.H.Chen

Formerly placed here
Ensete davyae (Stapf) Cheesman (as M. davyae Stapf)
Ensete gilletii (De Wild.) Cheesman (as M. gilletii De Wild. or M. martretiana A.Chev.)
Ensete glaucum (Roxb.) Cheesman (as M. glauca Roxb.)
Ensete lasiocarpum (Franch.) Cheesman (as M. lasiocarpa Franch.) – also placed in a separate genus as Musella lasiocarpa (Franch.) C.Y.Wu ex H.W.Li
Ensete livingstoniana (J. Kirk) Cheesman (as M. livingstoniana J.Kirk)
Ensete perrieri (Stapf) Cheesman (as M. perrieri Claverie)
Ensete superbum (Roxb.) Cheesman (as M. superba Roxb.)
Ensete ventricosum (Welw.) Cheesman (as M. arnoldiana De Wild., M. ensete J.F.Gmel. or M. ventricosum (Welw.) Cheesman)
Heliconia bihai (L.) L. (as M. bihai L.)

Cultivated bananas

A number of distinct groups of plants bearing edible fruit have been developed from species of Musa. In English, fruits which are sweet and used for dessert are usually called "bananas", whereas starchier varieties used for cooking are called "plantains", but these terms do not have any botanical significance. The next but much smaller group is derived from members of section Callimusa (previously classified as Australimusa) and is restricted in importance to Polynesia. Of even more restricted importance are small groups of hybrids from Papua New Guinea; a group from section Musa to which Musa schizocarpa has also contributed, and a group of hybrids between section Musa and section Callimusa.

Banana and plantains are the fourth most produced food globally surpassed only by the staple crops of rice, wheat and maize.

Properties
Plants of the Musa spp. including roots, flowers and fruits have been used in the folk medicine cultures of Africa, Asia, India and the Americas. Modern studies examining the properties of the fruits have found diversity of bioactive compounds among genotypes compared with commercially grown cultivars.

Section Musa cultivars

When the Linnaean binomial system was abandoned for cultivated bananas, an alternate genome-based system for the nomenclature of edible bananas in section Musa was devised. Thus, the plant previously known by the "species" name Musa cavendishii became Musa (AAA Group) 'Dwarf Cavendish'. The "new" name shows clearly that 'Dwarf Cavendish' is a triploid, with three sets of chromosomes, all derived from Musa acuminata, which is designated by the letter "A". When Musa balbisiana is involved, the letter "B" is used to denote its genome. Thus, the cultivar 'Rajapuri' may be called Musa (AAB Group) 'Rajapuri'. 'Rajapuri' is also a triploid, expected to have two sets of chromosomes from Musa acuminata and one from Musa balbisiana. In the genome of edible bananas from section Musa, combinations such as AA, BB, ABB, BBB and even AAAB can be found.

Fe'i-type cultivars

No such nomenclature system has been developed for the group of edible bananas derived from section Callimusa. This group is known generally as the "Fe'i" or "Fehi" bananas, and numerous cultivars are found in the South Pacific region. They are very distinctive plants with upright fruit bunches, featuring in three of Paul Gauguin's paintings. The flesh can be cooked before eating and is bright orange, with a high level of beta carotene. Fe'i bananas are no longer very important for food, as imported foods have grown in popularity, although some have ritual significance. Investigations are under way to use the Fe'i karat bananas (the name derives from "carrot" due to the intense orange-yellow color of the fruit) in prevention of childhood blindness in Pohnpei. Fe'i bananas probably derive mainly from Musa maclayi, although their origins are not as well understood as the section Musa bananas. Cultivars can be formally named, as e.g. Musa (Fe'i Group) 'Utafun'.

Other uses
In addition to the edible fruits, the flowers can be eaten cooked, and the heart of the plant (like heart of palm) can be eaten raw or cooked. Additionally, the rootstocks and leaf sheaths of some species can be cooked and eaten.

See also
Ensete (false bananas); for more information about Musella, also see Musella lasiocarpa
True plantains

Notes

References

Further reading

 Hedrick, U.P. (ed.) (1919): Sturtevant's Edible Plants of the World. J.B. Lyon Co., Albany.
 Nelson, S.C.; Ploetz, R.C. & Kepler, A.K. (2006): Musa species (banana and plantain).

External links

 Musapedia, page on Musa wild species
 Musapedia, page on Musa sections
 Musapedia, page on the diversity of banana cultivars
 Musa basjoo photos
 Detailed discussion of bananas
 Musarama, banana image bank
 

 
Zingiberales genera
Musaceae